Cheng Hsien-tzu (born 18 April 1993) is a Taiwanese table tennis player. She attended Chinese Culture University.

References

1993 births
Living people
Taiwanese female table tennis players
Chinese Culture University alumni
Universiade medalists in table tennis
Universiade silver medalists for Chinese Taipei
Universiade bronze medalists for Chinese Taipei
Table tennis players at the 2018 Asian Games
World Table Tennis Championships medalists
Asian Games competitors for Chinese Taipei
Taiwanese expatriate sportspeople in France
Taiwanese expatriate sportspeople in Germany
Sportspeople from New Taipei
Medalists at the 2015 Summer Universiade
Medalists at the 2017 Summer Universiade
Table tennis players at the 2020 Summer Olympics
Olympic table tennis players of Taiwan
21st-century Taiwanese women